Asporça Hatun was a wife of Sultan Orhan of the Ottoman Empire. 

Possibly of Greek origin, Asporça was the mother of three or four of Orhan's children, Ibrahim Bey, Fatma Hatun and Selçuk Hatun, and according to some authors also Şerefullah Bey

She appointed the first Ottoman grand vizier Alaeddin Pasha
as the representative for her foundations. In September 1323, her father-in-law, Osman I, granted her two villages, Narlı and Kiyaklı, which she then deeded to her descendants, making her son Ibrahim, or Ibrahim and Şerefullah, her executor.

When she died, she was buried along with her husband Orhan in the tomb of the latter's father Osman, located in Bursa; the original tomb having been replaced by two new tomb, her sarcophagus is housed in Osman's new tomb, while Orhan has his own tomb.

See also

Ottoman Empire
Ottoman dynasty

References

Sources
 

14th-century consorts of Ottoman sultans
1300 births
1362 deaths
14th-century deaths
Daughters of Byzantine emperors